Devkota Memorial Higher Secondary School is situated in the city of Biratnagar, Nepal.  Tika Prasad Upretti is the founder of the college.

External links

Schools in Nepal
2015 disestablishments in Nepal